Skylight is an unincorporated community in Oldham County, Kentucky, United States. It was also known as Tippecanoe.

References

Unincorporated communities in Kentucky
Unincorporated communities in Oldham County, Kentucky